Jolly Fellows, also translated as Happy-Go-Lucky Guys, Moscow Laughs and Jazz Comedy, is a 1934 Soviet musical film, directed by Grigori Aleksandrov and starring his wife Lyubov Orlova, a gifted singer and the first recognized star of Soviet cinema.

The script was written by Aleksandrov, Vladimir Mass, and Nikolai Erdman (whose father briefly appears on screen as a German music teacher). It features several songs which instantly became classics across the Soviet Union. The most famous song — "Kak mnogo devushek khoroshikh" (Such a lot of nice girls) — enjoyed international fame, covered as "Serdtse" (Heart) by Pyotr Leshchenko. Music was by Isaak Dunayevsky, the lyrics were written by the Soviet poet Vasily Lebedev-Kumach.

Both Orlova and her co-star, the jazz singer and comic actor Leonid Utyosov, were propelled to stardom after this movie.

Plot

Yelena (Mariya Strelkova), a well-off would-be singer who can't carry a tune, mistakes shepherd Kostya Potekhin (Leonid Utyosov) for a famous Paraguayian conductor of a symphony orchestra Costa Fraschini and invites him to an elegant party held in her house. He plays his pan flute, which attracts the herd of animals from his kolkhoz to the dining tables. Yelena's servant Anyuta (Lyubov Orlova) falls for Kostya. But Kostya is attracted to Yelena, and when she turns him down following the discovery of his real identity, he is very upset. He leaves for the city to try himself as a professional musician and finds himself in many comical situations. Eventually he joins a jazz band consisting of young "jolly fellows". Kostya becomes a head of the band and it turns to be quite a challenge – not only is he supposed to manage the creative work and performances but he must also control his quick-tempered bandmates, whose fiery arguments sometimes turn rehearsals into a brawl that results in the band being turned out of the house by their landlord. Because of this the band is urged to rehearse before a forthcoming performance right in the street and even play at funerals for more practice. On a rainy evening Kostya and his band mates accidentally meet Anyuta on their way to a concert hall and take her with them. She is revealed to be an excellent singer, so she joins the band and they start to perform together successfully.

Contemporary criticism
Graham Greene, in his 26 September 1935 review for The Spectator, wrote that it "is the best thing that has happened to the cinema since René Clair made The Italian Straw Hat. Alexandrov, who has been awarded a Soviet Order for his direction, has produced, just as Clair did then, out of the smallest resources and apparently with poor-quality film, a picture of almost ecstatic happiness. ... I have no wish to criticise this film, but simply to rejoice in its wildness, its grotesqueness, its light, taking tunes, a sense of good living that owes nothing to champagne or women's clothes."

Film critic Jean Ross — writing as Peter Porcupine in her 1 October 1935 review for The Daily Worker — effusively praised the film: "The workers in the Soviet Union have introduced to the world an entirely new sort of humour... behind the comedy of Jazz Comedy is no dismal shadow of tragedy, but the electrifying strength and vitality and freedom of a victorious working class."

Influence
The film was enormously successful in the Soviet Union.  It had a small impact much later in Australia after it was shown in 1964 at the Australia Cinema in Melbourne and the name "The Jolly Fellows" was used for over a decade thereafter by a small jazz band after the original members, David Meadows, Keith Morgan and Pete Bannister, high school friends and then all aged 19, had seen and enjoyed the film.

Cast

 Lyubov Orlova
 Leonid Utyosov
 Mariya Strelkova	
 Yelena Tyapkina	
 Fyodor Kurikhin		
 Arnold Arnold		
 Valentin Parnakh

References

External links

 
 
 http://www.close-up.ru/catalog/detail.php?FID=5325

1934 films
Mosfilm films
1930s Russian-language films
1934 musical comedy films
1930s romantic musical films
Films set in Moscow
Films set in the Soviet Union
Films shot in Georgia (country)
Films shot in Moscow
Soviet black-and-white films
Soviet musical comedy films
Russian musical comedy films
Films directed by Grigori Aleksandrov
Films scored by Isaak Dunayevsky